The Odisha Olympic Association (OOA) is the governing body of sports in Odisha. It is responsible for selecting athletes to represent India at the Olympic Games, Commonwealth Games, Asian Games and National Games of India.

History
The history of organised sports in Odisha traces its origins to 1904, when Madhusudan Das formed the Orissa Sports Association. It was an athletic institution which organised the sports competitions for seasonal and annual provincial games. It eventually became the Orissa Athletic Association in 1909 and remained the primary sports association in the province until the formation of Orissa Olympic Association in 1946. Harekrushna Mahatab became the first President of OOA and Bhairab Chandra Mohanty became the first secretary.

The OOA decided to make separate associations in 1961 for sports such as cricket, football, hockey, tennis and badminton, thus paving the way for formation of independent sports bodies for the governance of sports in Odisha.

OOA Executive Council
The OOA Executive Committee for the 2020–24 term:

OOA Sports Associations

Subsidiaries
Odisha Association of Blind (Bhubaneswar)
Odisha State Association of Deaf (Bhubaneswar)

See also
India at the Olympics
Sport in India
Sports in Odisha

References

External links
Official Website
India's Profile at National Olympic Committee's Website

Sports governing bodies in India
Sport in Odisha
Organisations based in Odisha
1946 establishments in India
Sports organizations established in 1946